The Pfynwald or Bois de Finges is a natural reserve and one of the largest continuous Scots pine forests of Europe. It is located on the language border between German- and French-speaking Valais, Switzerland, on the alluvial cone below the Illgraben valley.

The area is protected under federal law since 1992 and harbors one of the last untouched riverine landscapes of Switzerland. On a length of about seven kilometers, the Rhône is allowed to meander freely. The western part of the natural reserve is dominated by prehistoric rock falls, alluvial deposits, and ponds. The forest clearing in the middle of the park contains a manor - its origin dates back to 1000 AD - and a memorial to the 1799 battle between the French and the revolting Upper Valaisans.

The name of the area derives from one of two Latin terms: ad fines (at the border) or pinus (pine tree).

References 
 

Valais
Nature reserves in Switzerland